Coady is an unincorporated community in east central Harris County, Texas, United States.

Education
Goose Creek Independent School District operates schools in the area.

External links

Unincorporated communities in Harris County, Texas
Unincorporated communities in Texas